{{DISPLAYTITLE:Epsilon2 Arae}}

Epsilon2 Arae (ε2 Arae, ε2 Ara) is the Bayer designation for a double star in the southern constellation of Ara. It is approximately  distant from Earth. With an apparent visual magnitude of 5.3, it is faintly visible to the naked eye.

The Fe+0.5 notation indicates that it has a somewhat higher than normal abundance of iron. It has a magnitude 8.65 companion at an angular separation of 0.590 arcseconds. It has a common proper motion white dwarf companion, WDS J17031-5314, with a magnitude of 13.47.

References

External links
 HR 6314
 Image Epsilon2 Arae

Ara (constellation)
Double stars
F-type main-sequence stars
Arae, Epsilon2
6314
153580
PD-53 08316
3985
083431